On Any Sunday: Motorcross, Malcolm, & More is a 2001 documentary film directed by Dana Brown of Step Into Liquid and Dust to Glory fame. The film is about one of the most famous films about motorcycle sport, On Any Sunday (1971), which was directed by Brown's father Bruce Brown.

External links
 Official site

 Monterey Media

Documentary films about auto racing
Films directed by Dana Brown
2001 films
2001 documentary films
American auto racing films
American sports documentary films
Motorcycle racing films
2000s English-language films
2000s American films